Rumen Tinkov (born 20 February 1987 in Plovdiv) is a Bulgarian footballer. He currently plays as a goalkeeper for FC Eurocollege.

Career
His first club was Spartak Plovdiv. Tinkov signed for Lokomotiv Sofia in early 2007 for a fee of €50,000 together with Ivaylo Dimitrov and Nikolay Pavlov.

References

Bulgarian footballers
1987 births
Living people
First Professional Football League (Bulgaria) players
FC Spartak Plovdiv players
FC Lokomotiv 1929 Sofia players
FC Lyubimets players
Botev Plovdiv players
Association football forwards